Seth Paul Waxman (born November 28, 1951) is an American lawyer who served as the 41st Solicitor General of the United States from 1997 to 2001. He then returned to private legal practice, and serves as the co-chairman of the appellate and Supreme Court litigation practice group at the law firm Wilmer Cutler Pickering Hale and Dorr. As of 2022, he has appeared before the Supreme Court more than 80 times.

Early life and education 
Waxman was born in 1951 in Hartford, Connecticut. His family is Jewish and lived in West Hartford, Connecticut. After graduating from Conard High School in 1969, Waxman attended Harvard University; in 1973, he received his Bachelor of Arts, summa cum laude, in social studies. Afterwards, Waxman spent a year in Kenya as a Rockefeller Fellow. He then attended Yale Law School, where he was managing editor of the Yale Law Journal, graduating with a Juris Doctor in 1977.

Career
After law school, Waxman spent one year as a law clerk to Judge Gerhard A. Gesell of the U.S. District Court for the District of Columbia. Thereafter, he entered the private practice of law with the boutique law firm Miller, Cassidy, Larroca & Lewin (now part of Baker Botts), where he specialized in complex criminal, civil, and appellate litigation. Waxman has received substantial recognition for his pro bono work, including the American Bar Association's Pro Bono Publico award and the Anti-Defamation League's Benjamin N. Cardozo Certificate of Merit.

Waxman joined the United States Department of Justice in May 1994. Prior to being appointed solicitor general, he served in a number of other positions in the Department of Justice, including acting solicitor general, acting deputy attorney general, principal deputy solicitor general, and associate deputy attorney general.

Waxman made the oral argument to the Supreme Court on behalf of the petitioners in Boumediene v. Bush, in which the court upheld habeas corpus rights for detainees at Guantanamo Bay.  Waxman also made oral arguments to the Supreme Court regarding arbitrary application of FCC sanctions on public nudity. In these arguments he used the friezes decorating the courtroom to illustrate how some nudity is acceptable in a public setting.

Waxman also made the oral argument to the Supreme Court on behalf of the respondent in Roper v. Simmons, in which the court held that the execution of minors was unconstitutional under the cruel and unusual clause of the 8th Amendment. Furthermore, he also represented Harvard University in the case, Students for Fair Admissions v. President and Fellows of Harvard College.

Affiliations

Waxman has long been active in Bar, community and school organizations. He is a Fellow of the American Bar Foundation, a member of the ABA's Standing Committee on Professionalism, a current and past ex officio member of several committees of the Judicial Conference of the United States, an ex officio member of the American Law Institute, and a member of the Visiting Committee for Harvard College.

See also
Barack Obama Supreme Court candidates

References

External links
Office of the Solicitor General
Seth Waxman at WilmerHale

1951 births
American democracy activists
Georgetown University Law Center faculty
Guantanamo Bay attorneys
Harvard College alumni
Living people
Lawyers from Hartford, Connecticut
United States Solicitors General
Lawyers from Washington, D.C.
Yale Law School alumni
Wilmer Cutler Pickering Hale and Dorr partners
Members of the American Law Institute